Ford is a Metropolitan Borough of Sefton ward in the Bootle Parliamentary constituency that covers the northern part of the locality of Litherland and all of Ford.

Councillors
 indicates seat up for re-election.
 indicates by-election.

Election results

Elections of the 2010s

References

Wards of the Metropolitan Borough of Sefton